The canton of Pont-d'Ain is an administrative division in eastern France. At the French canton reorganisation which came into effect in March 2015, the canton was expanded from 11 to 24 communes:
 
Bolozon 
Boyeux-Saint-Jérôme
Ceignes
Cerdon
Challes-la-Montagne
Dortan
Izernore
Jujurieux
Labalme
Leyssard
Matafelon-Granges
Mérignat
Neuville-sur-Ain
Nurieux-Volognat
Peyriat
Poncin
Pont-d'Ain
Priay
Saint-Alban
Saint-Jean-le-Vieux
Samognat
Serrières-sur-Ain
Sonthonnax-la-Montagne
Varambon

Demographics

See also
Cantons of the Ain department 
Communes of France

References

Cantons of Ain